Ken Healy (born 15 October 1967) is an Australian cricketer. He played in one first-class and one List A match for Queensland between 1990 and 1992. He is the brother of Ian Healy.

See also
 List of Queensland first-class cricketers

References

External links
 

1967 births
Living people
Australian cricketers
Queensland cricketers
Cricketers from Brisbane